A hexamine stove, or hexi-stove, is a cooking stove that uses hexamine fuel tablets. The fuel tablets are also known as hexamethyl-enetetramine or methenamine. The stove's function is use in emergency situations. It acts as a platform for cooking and windbreak for such cooking. The hexamine stove is designed to fold into a compact size for storage.

References

Stoves